Jim Cullum Jr. (September 20, 1941 – August 11, 2019) was an American jazz cornetist known for his contributions to Dixieland jazz. His father was Jim Cullum Sr., a clarinetist who led the Happy Jazz Band until 1973. Jim Cullum Jr. led the Jim Cullum Jazz Band as its successor. His band mates included Evan Christopher, Allan Vaché, and John Sheridan.

Career
With his father, Cullum established the San Antonio jazz club The Landing in 1963. He had broadcast performances from the club on the Public Radio International series Riverwalk Jazz since 1989. Cullum performed at Carnegie Hall, The Kennedy Center, and Austin City Limits. He recorded for Jazzology, Columbia, Audiophile, Stomp Off, and his label, Riverwalk.

From 1993 until 2005, Cullum and his band were on the faculty of the Stanford Jazz Workshop at Stanford University in California. In 2011, Stanford University Libraries acquired Cullum's "Riverwalk Jazz" archives, comprising over 400 radio show programs. In January 2013, Stanford's Archive of Recorded Sound made the recordings available to listen to on its web site.

He remained active even after the radio show and his longstanding residency at The Landing ended in 2012. In his final years, he appeared in weekly performances at the Cookhouse Restaurant in San Antonio and scheduled many other appearances with his band. His last public performance was just two days before his death.

Jim Cullum Jazz Band
The Jim Cullum Jazz Band is an acoustic seven-piece traditional jazz ensemble.  Since 1989, the band has been featured nationally on their weekly public radio series, Riverwalk Jazz. The band performed live at the Landing Jazz Club on the San Antonio River Walk from 1981 to 2011.

Happy Jazz Band
The Jim Cullum Jazz Band is the successor to the Happy Jazz Band, which was formed in 1962 by Cullum and his father, Jim. The next year, a group of San Antonio investors founded the Landing Jazz Club in the basement of the Nix Hospital building on the San Antonio River Walk. The Landing was the second business established on the Riverwalk after the Casa Rio Mexican restaurant. Cullum took over leadership of the band after his father died in 1973 and changed the name to the Jim Cullum Jazz Band.

The Mission City Hot Rhythm Cats, a six-piece traditional jazz band, is composed of several former members of the Jim Cullum Jazz Band.

Band members

Current members
 Evan Arntzen – clarinet, saxophone
 Mike Pittsley – trombone
 Howard Elkins – banjo, guitar
 Bernie Attridge – bass
 Benji Bohannon – drums

Former members
 Jim Cullum Jr. - cornet
 Buddy Apfel – tuba
 Robert Black – banjo
 Evan Christopher – clarinet
 Kevin Dorn – drums
 Ron Hockett – clarinet, saxophone
 Ed Hubble – trombone
 Jim Hunter – bass
 Don Mopsick – bass
 Brian Nalepka – tuba, double bass, bass sax
 Brian Ogilvie – clarinet, saxophone
 Steve Pikal – bass
 Ric Ramirez – bass
 Randy Reinhart – cornet, trombone
 Kenny Rupp – trombone
 Zack Sapunor – bass
 John Sheridan – piano
 Hal Smith – drums
 Ed Torres – drums
 Jim Turner – piano
 Allan Vache – clarinet
 Mike Waskiewicz – drums
 Jack Wyatt – bass
 Cullen Offer – tenor saxophone

Discography
Look Over Here (1976)
Jim Cullum's Happy Jazz Band (1979)
Live and Swinging (1979)
Live at the Memphis Jazz Festival (1982)
Tis the Season...To Be Jamming (1984)
Porgy & Bess (1985)
Super Satch (1986)
Fireworks! Red Hot & Blues (1989)
Hooray for Hoagy! (1990)
American Love Songs, Vol. 7 (1990)
Shootin' the Agate (1992)
Battle of the Bands: San Antonio vs. New Orleans (1992)
New Year's All Star Jam (1993)
Honky Tonk Train (1994)
Bessie & the Blues (1995)
Jim Cullum's Happy Jazz Band (1995)
Hot Jazz for a Cool Yule (1996)
Fireworks! Red Hot & Blues (1996)
American Love Songs, Vol. 7 (1997)
Deep River: The Spirit of Gospel Music in Jazz (1998)
Cornet-Copia (2001)
Chasin' the Blues (2006)
3 Kings of Jazz: The Music of Louis Armstrong, Bix Beiderbecke and Jelly Roll Morton (2008)

References

External links
 "Jim Cullum's Adventures", The New York Times
 Guide to the Jim Cullum Collection
 Interview (June 11, 1980)
 Interview (August 12, 1986)
 Jim Cullum on Live at Jazz, TX

1941 births
2019 deaths
American jazz cornetists
Jazz radio presenters
American radio personalities
Jazz musicians from Texas
Musicians from San Antonio
Jazzology Records artists
Stomp Off artists
Columbia Records artists